Daniel R. Benson (born November 22, 1975) is an American Democratic Party politician who serves in the New Jersey General Assembly representing the 14th Legislative District. Benson, who previously served on the Mercer County Board of Chosen Freeholders, replaced Assemblywoman Linda R. Greenstein, after she was elected to the New Jersey Senate  in a special election. He was sworn in on January 10, 2011, to fill Greenstein's vacant Assembly seat.

Early life and education
Benson received a B.S degree from Georgetown University, studying physics and government, and a Master of Public Policy degree from Rutgers University's Edward J. Bloustein School of Planning and Public Policy, studying science and technology policy. He was elected to the Hamilton Township Council in 2002, becoming the youngest elected councilman in township history. He served on the council until 2005, when he gave up his seat to run for the New Jersey General Assembly. Benson lost the Assembly race, finishing behind the incumbents, Republican Bill Baroni and Democrat Linda R. Greenstein.

Mercer County Board of Chosen Freeholders 
In 2008, Benson was appointed to a seat on the Mercer County Board of Chosen Freeholders by county Democrats replacing Elizabeth Maher Muoio who took on a county job. He won a special election in November 2008 to complete the remainder of Muoio's term and was re-elected to a full three-year term in 2009.

New Jersey Assembly 
When Assemblywoman Greenstein won a special election to fill the remainder of Baroni's Senate term in November 2010, Benson ran for the vacant Assembly seat. On January 8, 2011, Benson was selected by a Democratic convention of Mercer and Middlesex counties (the counties that compose the 14th District) to replace Greenstein. He was sworn in on January 10, 2011.

Committees 
Transportation and Independent Authorities
Budget
Health and Senior Services

District 14 
Each of the 40 districts in the New Jersey Legislature has one representative in the New Jersey Senate and two members in the New Jersey General Assembly. The representatives from the 14th District for the 2022—23 Legislative Session are:
 Senator Linda R. Greenstein (D)
 Assemblyman Daniel R. Benson (D)
 Assemblyman Wayne DeAngelo (D)

Electoral history

New Jersey Assembly

References

External links
Assemblyman Daniel R. Benson's legislative web page, New Jersey Legislature
New Jersey Legislature financial disclosure forms – 2015 2014 2013 2012 2011 2010

1975 births
Georgetown College (Georgetown University) alumni
Living people
County commissioners in New Jersey
New Jersey city council members
Democratic Party members of the New Jersey General Assembly
People from Hamilton Township, Mercer County, New Jersey
Politicians from Mercer County, New Jersey
Rutgers University alumni
21st-century American politicians